Nicholas Bennett may refer to:
 Nicholas Bennett (historian), Welsh historian and musician
 Nicholas Bennett (politician), British politician
 Nicholas Bennett (swimmer), Canadian Paralympic swimmer
 Nicholas John Bennett, British civil servant